The 2000 Copa Norte was the fourth edition of a football competition held in Brazil. Featuring 11 clubs, Pará have four vacancies; Acre, Amapá, Amazonas, Maranhão, Piauí, Rondônia and Roraima with one each. 

In the finals, São Raimundo defeated Maranhão 4–3 on aggregate to win their second title and earn the right to play in the 2000 Copa dos Campeões.

Qualified teams

Preliminary round

Group stage

Group A

Group B

Bracket

Finals

São Raimundo won 4–3 on aggregate.

References

Copa Norte
Copa Norte
Copa Norte